The Chicago Area Rugby Football Union (CARFU) is the Local Area Union (LAU) for rugby union teams in the Chicago metropolitan area. CARFU is part of the Midwest Rugby Football Union (MRFU), which is also the governing body for the Allegheny, Illinois, Indiana, Iowa, Michigan, Minnesota, Ohio, and Wisconsin LAU's. All local and territorial unions are part of USA Rugby.

Men's

Division I
Chicago Griffins 
Chicago Lions

Division II
Chicago Blaze (Lemont, IL) 
Lincoln Park (Chicago) 
Southside Irish (Chicago) 
Chicago Riot (Chicago)

Division III
Fox Valley Maoris (St. Charles, IL) 
Chicago Westside Condors  
IASCW Shamrocks (Manhattan, IL) 
Illiana Misfits Rugby (Hammond, IN) 
Northwest Indiana Exiles (Hobart, IN)
Northwest Woodsmen (Schaumburg, IL) 
Rockford Ravens

Division IV
Chicago Blue (Law Enforcement Rugby) 
Chicago Dragons 
Chicago Roosters (Wheaton, IL) 
Kellogg Graduate School of Management
Lake County Gladiators

Women's

Women's Premiere League (WPL)
Chicago North Shore Women's RFC

Division I
Chicago Women's

Division II
Chicago Sirens,
County Will Morrigans, Fox Valley Vixens, Illiana Banshees

Collegiate
CARFU features teams from eight schools: Chicago, DePaul, Illinois-Chicago, Lake Forest, Loyola, Northern Illinois, Northwestern, Lewis, and Elmhurst. As of 2008, Notre Dame switched to Division I status, the only CARFU collegiate club competing at that level. Lake Forest only plays in the spring and does not compete for the CARFU Cup in the fall. The University of Chicago is one of the oldest clubs in the US, having been formed in 1933. Lewis University and Elmhurst are the newest members of CARFU, with Elmhurst beginning play in fall 2010. Loyola, Northern Illinois, UIC, and Lake Forest compete at the Division II level. Elmhurst, Lewis, DePaul, and the University of Chicago are Division III.

Men's

2006 CARFU Champion, Loyola, lost to Wisconsin–Milwaukee 49–0 in the first round of the Midwest Division II Playoffs, and then subsequently lost to Iowa St. 8–3.
The 2007 CARFU Champion was Northwestern University, winning it for the first time since 1999. They went 5–0 in conference play and 5-1 overall.
The 2008 CARFU Champion was Loyola (4-1), although Northern Illinois University (5-0) beat them earlier in the season.  Northern Illinois was disqualified because some of their players were not CIPPed in time for the first game of the season.  Loyola went on to the Midwest Rugby Union playoffs.  Loyola and Northwestern have won the last six CARFU titles (Loyola-4, Northwestern-2).
2010 CARFU champion, Northern Illinois University, with a 7–1 season.
2011 CARFU champion, Northern Illinois University
2012 CARFU champion, Northern Illinois University
2013 CARFU champion, Northern Illinois University

LAU Competition

References

Sports associations based in Chicago
Rugby union governing bodies in the United States
Rugby union in Indiana
Sports organizations established in 1974
1974 establishments in Illinois
Rugby union in Illinois